The 2020 European Junior and U23 Canoe Slalom Championships took place at the Kraków-Kolna Canoe Slalom Course in Kraków, Poland from 1 to 4 October 2020 under the auspices of the European Canoe Association (ECA). The event was moved from its original date (13 to 16 August 2020) due to the COVID-19 pandemic. It was the 22nd edition of the competition for Juniors (U18) and the 18th edition for the Under 23 category. Several leading countries (including Great Britain, Slovakia and Spain) opted out of the event completely.

Medal summary

Men

Canoe

Junior

U23

Kayak

Junior

U23

Women

Canoe

Junior

U23

Kayak

Junior

U23

Medal table

References

External links
European Canoe Association

European Junior and U23 Canoe Slalom Championships
European Junior and U23 Canoe Slalom Championships
European Junior and U23 Canoe Slalom Championships
European Junior and U23 Canoe Slalom Championships
European Junior and U23 Canoe Slalom Championships